Wachwaqucha (Quechua wachwa Andean goose, qucha lake, lagoon, "Andean goose lake", hispanicized spelling Huachuguacocha) is a lake in Peru located in the Lima Region, Huarochiri Province, Carampoma District. It lies northwest of Millpu and Wachwa and southwest of Wamp'arqucha.

See also
List of lakes in Peru

References

Lakes of Peru
Lakes of Lima Region